The Payton Ranch Limestone is a geologic formation in the Klamath Mountains province (geology) of Northwestern California.

It preserves fossils dating back to the Silurian period of the Paleozoic Era.

It is a Limestone Member of the Silurian Gazelle Formation.

See also

 List of fossiliferous stratigraphic units in California
 Paleontology in California

References

Silurian California
Klamath Mountains
Limestone formations of the United States
Silurian System of North America
Geologic formations of California
Silurian southern paleotropical deposits